This Battle of Megiddo is recorded as having taken place in 609 BC when Pharaoh Necho II of Egypt led his army to Carchemish (northern Syria) to join with his allies, the fading Neo-Assyrian Empire, against the surging Neo-Babylonian Empire. This required passing through territory controlled by the Kingdom of Judah. The Judaean king Josiah refused to let the Egyptians pass. The Judaean forces battled the Egyptians at Megiddo, resulting in Josiah's death and his kingdom becoming a vassal state of Egypt. The battle is recorded in the Hebrew Bible, the Greek 1 Esdras, and the writings of Josephus.

While Necho II gained control of the Kingdom of Judah, the Assyrian forces lost to the Babylonians & Medes at the Fall of Harran, after which Assyria largely ceased to exist as an independent state.

Biblical accounts 
The basic story is told in 2 Kings 23:29–30 (written c. 550 BC). The Hebrew text here has been misunderstood and translated as Necho going 'against' Assyria. Cline 2000:92-93 notes that most modern translations try to improve this passage by taking into account what we now know from other historical sources, namely that Egypt and Assyria were then allies. The original text also does not mention a 'battle', yet some modern versions add the word 'battle' to the text.
In his days Pharaoh Neco king of Egypt went up to the king of Assyria to the river Euphrates. King Josiah went to meet him; and Pharaoh Neco slew him at Megiddo, when he saw him. And his servants carried him dead in a chariot from Megiddo, and brought him to Jerusalem, and buried him in his own tomb.

There is a longer account recorded later in II Chronicles 35:20–25 (written c. 350–300 BC).
After all this, when Josiah had set the temple in order, Neco king of Egypt came up to make war at Carchemish on the Euphrates, and Josiah went out to engage him. But Neco sent messengers to him, saying, "What have we to do with each other, O King of Judah? I am not coming against you today but against the house with which I am at war, and God has ordered me to hurry. Stop for your own sake from interfering with God who is with me, so that He will not destroy you." However, Josiah would not turn away from him, but disguised himself in order to make war with him; nor did he listen to the words of Neco from the mouth of God, but came to make war on the plain of Megiddo. The archers shot King Josiah, and the king said to his servants, "Take me away, for I am badly wounded." So his servants took him out of the chariot and carried him in the second chariot which he had, and brought him to Jerusalem where he died and was buried in the tombs of his fathers.

Other accounts 
The account in Esdras adds some minor details, with the basic difference between it and the earlier account in the Book of Chronicles being that Josiah is described only as being 'weak' at Megiddo and asks to be taken back to Jerusalem, where he dies. Cline points out that this brings the story more in line with an earlier prophecy made by the prophetess Huldah (II Kings 22:15–20).

Seven centuries after Josiah's death, Josephus also wrote an account of the events. This contains more details about Josiah's movements on the battlefield which have been suggested come from documents now lost, but Cline suggests it is based on the biblical accounts and perhaps Josephus's own views. (Cline 2000:97)

Finally there is the suggestion that Herodotus records this battle and Egyptian campaign in his writings about the pharaoh Necho, that are included in his famous Histories:

The battle is also discussed in the Talmud where it says that Josiah did not let the Egyptians pass because of a passage in the Bible which says that "A sword shall not pass through your land". (Leviticus 26:6 Taanis 22b)

Also mentioning the Battle is the Kinnah for the 9th of Av, "And Jeremiah lamented over Josiah" (Kinnah 11) which seems to give a vague picture of the battle. The Judeans held the high ground, atop the hill, where they attempted to shower the advancing Egyptians with arrows. The Judean "professional" infantry of the time seems to have been some sort of force of hand-to-hand combatants who also were equipped with bows. Egyptian chariots charging seems to have driven them back, whereupon the now-damaged Judean infantry was attacked by the Egyptian infantry. Desperately trying to maintain his men's morale, Josiah ordered his charioteer to position his chariot right behind his center. Although the Kerathites advised the King to retreat, Josiah adamantly refused. Seeing the Judean Royal standard, the Egyptian Archers focused on Josiah as a target, and though he was struck 300 times, only one arrow seems to have found its mark, possibly striking him under the left arm. Josiah is withdrawn from the battle, gravely wounded, and, seeing their King retreat, the Judean Army loses hope as well, and a rout follows.

Location

A view at the topography of the place around the city reveals that Megiddo is a small rise among others on a small elevated plateau close to a large level coastal plain large enough to accommodate many thousands of troops. Since it foes dominate the surrounding area, it is not an obvious target, but it is useful as a garrison and has a water source from the Kishon River. That explains why Josiah used the terrain to mask his approach as he attempted to ambush the Egyptian army that was on its way to attack the Babylonians in Mesopotamia.

Aftermath 
Judah fell under Egyptian control and influence. On his return from Syria and Mesopotamia, Necho II captured and deposed Jehoahaz, the son of Josiah who had just succeeded his father on the throne. The pharaoh enforced a tribute of 100 talents of silver (about 3 tons or about 3.4 metric tons) and a talent of gold (about ) upon the kingdom, and appointed Jehoahaz' older brother Eliakim as king. Necho also changed the name of this new king into Jehoiakim. Jehoahaz was taken captive to Egypt, where he became the first king of Judah to die in exile.

Debate over the account in II Chronicles
Eric H. Cline explains that there is a division of opinion as to the accuracy of the above account. On one side are the scholars who believe that it is an accurate report of a surprise attack by Josiah. On the other are those who point out that it would not be the only time the Chronicler 'improved' a story. From being wounded by an arrow to his burial in Jerusalem, the story resembles perhaps too closely stories from I and II Kings about Kings Ahab of Israel and Ahaziah of Judah, events which occurred at least two centuries before Josiah's death. Cline suggests that the Chronicler used details from these stories in Josiah's story.

Cline also suggests the possibility that there may not have been a historical battle of Megiddo involving Josiah since there is little historical attestation for it outside the Bible. For example, Josiah may have been killed by Necho in some other circumstances.

See also 
Megiddo
Fall of Harran

Notes

References

Bibliography
Cline, Eric H. (2000), The Battles of Armageddon: Megiddo and the Jezreel Valley from the Bronze Age to the Nuclear Age, University of Michigan Press, p. 89ff 

609 BC
7th-century BC conflicts
Battles involving ancient Egypt
Wars of ancient Israel
Hebrew Bible battles
7th century BC in the Kingdom of Judah
Necho II
Battles involving Assyria